Talat Sao (Lao: ຕະຫຼາດເຊົ້າ) is a morning market in Vientiane, Laos.

At the eastern corner of Lan Xang Rd. and Khu Vieng Rd. in the heart of Vientiane, the morning market is open daily from 07:00 until around 16:00. The market is two-storey and covered by several sloping roofs. It is a popular tourist destination. The market consists of many small shops, restaurants, fruit and vegetable vendors; jewellery; silk; wooden crafts; musical instruments; electronics; home appliances; housewares, CDs and DVDs/VCDs, and grocery items. Depending on the time of day and the weather conditions the market can be nearly empty or full to capacity.

Renovations

A new, more modern building is currently being constructed on the property. The new facilities will include a four storey shopping centre and indoor parking. When completed this will expand and replace the current market facilities. The development is being undertaken by Singapore Excalibur Group Pte Ltd at an estimated cost of US$27 million. Completion was expected by 2009.

 

Market houses
Economy of Vientiane
Buildings and structures in Vientiane
Tourist attractions in Vientiane